Helmer Johansson  (1895–1955) was a Swedish politician. He was a member of the Centre Party.

References

This article was initially translated from the Swedish Wikipedia article.

Centre Party (Sweden) politicians
1895 births
1955 deaths